Le Grand Docu-Soap is Army of Lovers sixth album. It's a compilation of previous albums, including three new songs: Let The Sunshine In, Hands Up and Everybody's Gotta Learn Sometimes. The first two were also released as singles.  It was released throughout Europe between May and August 2001.

Track listing

CD
"Ride the Bullet"
"Crucified"
"Obsession"
"Give My Life"
"Sexual Revolution"
"Israelism"
"I Am"
"Lit De Parade"
"Let the Sunshine In" (3:55)
"Life Is Fantastic"
"Venus and Mars"
"King Midas"
"My Army of Lovers"
"La Plage de Saint Tropez"
"Candyman Messiah"
"Hands Up" (3:12)
"Everybody's Gotta Learn Sometime" (4:35)
"Supernatural"

Digital download
"Ride the Bullet"
"Obsession"
"King Midas"
"Candyman Messiah"
"I Am"
"Crucified"
"Sexual Revolution"
"Israelism"
"Life Is Fantastic"
"La Plage de Saint Tropez"
"Give My Life"
"Venus and Mars"
"Everybody's Gotta Learn Sometime"
"Supernatural"
"Hands Up"
"My Army of Lovers"
"Lit De Parade"
"Let the Sunshine In"
"We Are the Universe"
"The Ballad of Marie Curie"
"Heterosexuality"
"Everytime You Lie"

Le Remixed Docu-Soap
When the album was launched, a bonus CD called Le Remixed Docu-Soap was included and contained remix editions of their biggest hits. Later, it was sold as a separate CD in Russia. Le Remixed Docu-Soap is not available for digital download, but is available on Spotify.

Track listing
Ride the Bullet (Tren De Amor Mix) 
Crucified (The Nuzak Remix) 
Obsession (Schizoperetta Mix) 
Give My Life (Sound Factory Mix) 
Sexual Revolution (Latin Club Mix) 
Israelism (Coldcalfhorahhorror Mix) 
I Am (Post Modern Vocal Dance) 
Lit De Parade (Plaisir De Nirvana Mix) 
Let The Sunshine In (M12 Maximum Long Club Mix) 
Candyman Messiah (Tolstoy Farm Mix)

Chart performance

Army of Lovers compilation albums
2001 compilation albums
2001 remix albums
Universal Music Group remix albums
Universal Music Group compilation albums